The Trageburg is a ruined castle immediately next to the Rappbode Pre-Dam in the Harz Mountains of Germany. It is located near Trautenstein in the district of Harz in Saxony-Anhalt.

Its purpose, like that of the nearby Susenburg, was to protect an old long-distance trade route that ran north–south over the Harz. The  Trogfurth Bridge also belonged to this road system. 

The Trageburg is checkpoint no. 52 in the Harzer Wandernadel hiking badge system.

References

External links 
 Artist's impression by Wolfgang Braun
 

Castles in Saxony-Anhalt
Harz (district)